Galaxy is a chocolate bar, made and marketed by Mars Inc., and first manufactured in the United Kingdom in the 1960s. Galaxy is sold in the United Kingdom, Ireland, South Africa, the Middle East, Morocco, India, Pakistan, Malta, and is also sold in the United States, Canada, Mexico and various Continental European countries as Dove. In 2014, Galaxy was ranked the second-best-selling chocolate bar in the UK, after Cadbury Dairy Milk.

Range
The Galaxy and Dove brands cover a wide range of products including chocolate bars in milk chocolate, caramel, Cookie Crumble, and Fruit & Nut varieties, Minstrels, Ripple (milk chocolate with a folded or "rippled" milk chocolate centre), Amicelli, Duetto, Promises, Bubbles and Truffle. Related brands in other parts of the world include "Jewels", and "Senzi" in the Middle East. The Galaxy and Dove brands also market a wide range of products including ready-to-drink chocolate milk, hot chocolate powder, chocolate cakes, ice cream and more.

A vegan Galaxy range launched in 2019.

Bubbles

Galaxy Bubbles is a chocolate bar made by Mars similar to a Cadburys Wispa or Nestlé Aero and was introduced in early 2010. The chocolate is like an ordinary Galaxy which has been aerated. The product also comes in an orange variety.

It is also available as a 100g 'block' or as a 28g milk chocolate egg (again with an aerated centre). The bar is suitable for vegetarians.

Honeycomb Crisp

Galaxy Honeycomb Crisp is a chocolate bar made by Mars that contains small granular nougats of honeycomb toffee, as part of the Galaxy chocolate range.

Marketing
A 2013 British television advertisement for Galaxy featured a computer-generated image of Audrey Hepburn, which was created by CGI firm Framestore in London. The commercial, set to Hepburn singing "Moon River", debuted in the UK in February 2013.

Galaxy previously sponsored the British Book Awards.

Gallery

See also

Mars, Incorporated
List of chocolate bar brands
Dove

References

External links
 
 Galaxy UK advertisement from 1980 on YouTube
 Galaxy advertisement from the late 1980s on YouTube

1960s establishments in the United Kingdom
British confectionery
Chocolate bars
Mars confectionery brands
Brand name confectionery